KFXM may refer to:

 KFXM-LP, a low-power radio station (98.3 FM) licensed to Lancaster, California, United States
 KTIE, a radio station (590 AM) licensed to San Bernardino, California, United States, which held the call sign KFXM from 1929 to the late 1980s
 KTMQ, a radio station (103.3 FM) licensed to Temecula, California, United States, which held the call sign KFXM from October 2000 to August 2001